Emsdetten is a railway station located in Emsdetten, Germany.

The station is located on the Münster–Rheine railway. The train services are operated by Deutsche Bahn and the WestfalenBahn.

Train services
The following services currently call at Emsdetten:
Rhein-Münsterland-Express Rheine - Münster - Hagen - Wuppertal - Cologne - Krefeld

Railway stations in North Rhine-Westphalia